Traverse, Northern Michigan's Magazine is a monthly magazine about life in Northern Michigan including Petoskey, Mackinac Island, Harbor Springs, Frankfort, Traverse City, Leelanau County, the Upper Peninsula, and more. Founded in June, 1981, The magazine has 23,000 subscribers throughout the country and sells 8,000 copies on newsstands throughout the Midwest.

Launched in 2008, MyNorth.com is the online home of averse, Northern Michigan’s Magazine and a portal to the Northern Michigan lifestyle. At MyNorth.com readers can access news plus a complete database of Northern Michigan attractions, travel ideas like Sleeping Bear Dunes and Mackinac, outdoors recreation, restaurant hot spots, wineries, breweries, northern style and events across Northern Michigan. The pages of Traverse Magazine are filled with four-color photography and articles on food, wine, restaurants, outdoors recreation, events, essays, history and Northern Michigan lifestyle. Other magazines produced by the staff of Traverse Magazine include Northern Home & Cottage, MyNorth Vacation Guide, MyNorth Wedding, Meetings North, Senior Living, and Holidays Up North. Books published include The Cottage Cookbook and Reflections of a Life Up North.

References

External links
 MyNorth
 WIAA: Traverse Magazine (2008-06-20)
 Traverse, Northern Michigan's Magazine Named Best Magazine of the Year by International Regional Magazine Association

1981 establishments in Michigan
Local interest magazines published in the United States
Monthly magazines published in the United States
Magazines established in 1981
Magazines published in Michigan
Mass media in Traverse City, Michigan